Pristurus  somalicus, also known as Somali rock gecko or Somali semaphore gecko, is a species of lizard in the Sphaerodactylidae family found in Somalia and Ethiopia.

References

Pristurus
Reptiles described in 1932